Intellectual property in India refers to the patents, copyrights and other intangible assets in India.

Government Policy
Indian government approved its first Intellectual Property Rights Policy in May 2016.

Laws

Copyrights

The "Copyright Act, 1957" (as amended by the Copyright Amendment Act 2012) governs the subject of copyright law in India. The history of copyright law in India can be traced back to its colonial era under the British Empire.  The Copyright Act, 1957 was the first post-independence copyright legislation in India and the law has been amended six times since 1957. The most recent amendment was in the year 2012, through the Copyright (Amendment) Act 2012.

Trademarks

"Indian trademark law" statutorily protects trademarks as per the Trademark Act, 1999 and also under the common law remedy of passing off. Statutory protection of trademark is administered by the Controller General of Patents, Designs and Trade Marks, a government agency which reports to the  Department of Industrial Policy and Promotion (DIPP), under the Ministry of Commerce and Industry.

Patents 

The Patents Act, 1970 were brought into the force on 20 April 1972, and further amendments were carried in 1999, 2002 and 2005. The Patent Rules, 2003 were introduced along with the Patent Act (amendment), 2002 on 20 May 2003, and recent amendments were carried in 2016, and 2017. The Patents (Amendment) Rules 2016 mainly focused on expediting the grant process, benefits to startup, and increase in official fees.

Authority

The Intellectual Property India is administered by the Office of the Controller General of Patents, Designs & Trade Marks (CGPDTM). This is a subordinate office of the Government of India and administers the Indian law of Patents, Designs, Trade Marks and Geographical Indications.

References

Indian intellectual property law